Anthony Bruce Walker  (born July 1, 1959) is an American former professional baseball player. Walker played in the 1986 season with the Houston Astros of the Major League Baseball (MLB). He played the outfield and batted and threw right-handed.

External links

1959 births
Living people
African-American baseball players
American expatriate baseball players in Canada
Baseball players from San Diego
Columbus Astros players
Daytona Beach Astros players
Eugene Emeralds players
Harrisburg Senators players
Houston Astros players
Tampa Tarpons (1957–1987) players
Tucson Toros players
Vancouver Canadians players
Waterbury Reds players
20th-century African-American sportspeople